Jakob Hlasek and John McEnroe were the defending champions, but lost in the quarterfinals.Omar Camporese and Diego Nargiso won the title, defeating Tom Nijssen and Udo Riglewski 6–4, 6–4, in the final.

Seeds

  Jakob Hlasek /  John McEnroe (quarterfinals)
  Anders Järryd /  Tomáš Šmíd (first round)
  Tim Pawsat /  Laurie Warder (first round)
  Jim Courier /  Pete Sampras (semifinals)

Draw

Draw

References
General

1990 Stella Artois Indoor